(born June 25, 1988) is a Japanese professional wrestler signed to New Japan Pro-Wrestling (NJPW), where he currently performs under the ring name Yoh (stylized in all capital letters), he is a former one-time NEVER Openweight 6-Man Tag Team Champion alongside Hirooki Goto and Yoshi-Hashi. Before, he was a part of the junior heavyweight tag team Roppongi 3K along with Sho, and the two are the former five-time IWGP Junior Heavyweight Tag Team Champions. He has previously also worked for the American Ring of Honor (ROH) and Mexican Consejo Mundial de Lucha Libre (CMLL), where he was known under the ring name , named after the Japanese God of the wind, and was part of La Ola Amarilla ("the Yellow Wave") alongside Okumura, Kamaitachi and Raijin.

Early life 
Komatsu was born on June 26, 1988, in Kurihara, Miyagi, Japan where he also grew up. He became interested in professional wrestling by watching it on TV with his parents from the age of three. While in school he joined the wrestling club, learning amateur wrestling at a young age.

Professional wrestling career 
After graduating from University Komatsu began training for his professional wrestling career at the New Japan Pro-Wrestling (NJPW) dojo. Initially, he worked a part-time job while trying to pass the NJPW "Young Lions" test, which he finally passed in May 2012.

New Japan Pro-Wrestling (2012–2016) 

He made his debut for NJPW on November 19, 2012, on NJPW's NEVER project's Shodai NEVER Musabetsu Kyu Oza Kettei Tournament show where he lost to Takaaki Watanabe. Komatsu competed as one of NJPW's "Young Lions" a class of rookie wrestlers who work mostly against each other early on, wearing all black gear and with no particular ring character, all part of the structured learning process in NJPW. In 2013 he competed in his first major NJPW tournament, teaming up with Kushida to compete in the 2013 Super Junior Tag Tournament. The team lost in the first round to Bushi and Valiente.
 On January 4, 2014 Komatsu teamed up with Jyushin Thunder Liger, Manabu Nakanishi and Super Strong Machine to work a non-televised match at Wrestle Kingdom 8 in Tokyo Dome, NJPW's biggest show of the year. The team lost to Bushi, Captain New Japan, Hiroyoshi Tenzan and Tomoaki Honma. Throughout 2013 and 2014 Komatsu often faced off against fellow Young Lion Sho Tanaka, with both men trading victories in both singles and tag team competition. By 2015 Komatsu and Tanaka had begun teaming together on a regular basis, including working together in the New Japan Rumble as part of Wrestle Kingdom 9 on January 5, 2015. The two teamed up to eliminate Tiger Mask and Taichi but were both eliminated by Tama Tonga On January 15, 2015 Komatsu competed at the Fantastica Mania 2015 event as he was called upon to replace the injured Rey Cometa in the NJPW/Consejo Mundial de Lucha Libre (CMLL) co-promoted event. The team of Komatsu and Kushida lost to Bárbaro Cavernario and Yoshi-Hashi. On February 11 Komatsu lost to Sho Tanaka at The New Beginning in Osaka show and three days later Komatsu and Satoshi Kojima lost to Captain New Japan and Nakanishi. The Invasion Attack 2015 show saw Komatsu, Alex Shelley, Captain New Japan, Kushida and Yuji Nagata defeated Liger, Nakanishi, Ryusuke Taguchi, Sho Tanaka and Tiger Mask.

He was selected to be one of 16 wrestlers selected to be part of the 2015 Best of the Super Juniors XXII tournament. He lost all his qualifying matches, being defeated by Bárbaro Cavernario, Beretta, Chase Owens, Gedo Liger
Kyle O'Reilly and Taguchi. At Dominion 7.5 in Osaka-jo Hall on July 5, 2015 Nakanishi, Máscara Dorada, Taguchi, Tanaka and Nagata defeated Hiroyoshi Tenzan, Liger, Kojima, Tiger Mask and Komatsu in the untelevised first match of the night. His next match at a major NJPW show was on September 23, 2015 at Destruction in Okayama where he, Tanaka, Katsuyori Shibata and Nagata defeated David Finlay, Jay White, Nakanishi and Tetsuya Naito. A few days later, at Destruction in Kobe Komatsu and Tanaka defeated fellow Young Lions David Finlay and Jay White. In early 2016 it was announced that Komatsu and Tanaka would compete in the 2016 Fantastica Mania series of shows, competing in what NJPW called the "Yohei Komatsu and Sho Tanaka send-off game", announcing that the two would travel to Mexico and work for CMLL as part of their continued in-ring skill development. The team worked the opening match for each of the six Fantastica Mania events, losing each time. On the last night Tetsuya Naito, Komatsu's original trainer, called Komatsu to the ring and implied that he was going to join Naito's group Los Ingobernables de Japón, but then proceeded to beat him up with Evil.

Overseas learning excursion (2016–2017) 
Komatsu and Tanaka would be the latest in a long line of young Japanese wrestlers to travel to Mexico to learn the lucha libre style. In Mexico, Komatsu was given the ring name Fujin, named after the Japanese God of Wind, teaming with Tanaka who would be known as Raijin, named after the Japanese God of Thunder. The duo made their Mexican debut on January 31, teaming up with Okumura, forming the most recent version of La Ola Amarilla ("The Yellow Wave"). The group was joined by Kamaitachi, the previous NJPW trainee who has worked for CMLL since 2014. On March 22, Fujin took part in the 2016 edition of The CMLL Torneo Gran Alternativa, a tournament in which rookies team up with veterans in a single-elimination tournament. Teaming up with Rey Escorpión, Fujin won his block, advancing to the finals of the tournament scheduled for April 5, in which they were defeated in the finals of the tournament by Esfinge and Volador Jr.

In October 2016, Komatsu and Tanaka, now billed as "Yohey" and "Sho", The Tempura Boyz, began working regularly for American promotion Ring of Honor (ROH), with whom NJPW also had a working relationship.

Return to NJPW (2017–present) 
On October 9, 2017, at King of Pro-Wrestling, Komatsu and Tanaka, billed as "Yoh" and "Sho", returned to NJPW, when they were revealed as Rocky Romero's new tag team Roppongi 3K. The two defeated Funky Future (Ricochet and Ryusuke Taguchi) in their return match to become the new IWGP Junior Heavyweight Tag Team Champions. Through their affiliation with Romero, Yoh and Sho also became part of the Chaos stable. On November 5 at Power Struggle, Roppongi 3K defeated Super 69 (A. C. H. and Ryusuke Taguchi) in the finals to win the 2017 Super Jr. Tag Tournament. On January 4, 2018, Roppongi 3K lost the IWGP Junior Heavyweight Tag Team Championship to The Young Bucks (Matt Jackson and Nick Jackson) at Wrestle Kingdom 12 in Tokyo Dome, but won it back on January 28 at the New Beginning in Sapporo. In May 2018, Yoh entered his second Best of the Super Juniors Tournament. He finished the tournament with 3 wins and 4 losses, failing to advance to the finals. In October, Sho and Yoh entered the 2018 Super Junior Tag League, winning the tournament for the second time in a row to face El Desperado and Yoshinobu Kanemaru at Wrestle Kingdom 13. However, an earlier loss to the team of Shingo Takagi and Bushi made the title match a triple threat, that Takagi and Bushi would go onto win, with Takagi pinning Sho. At New Japan’s 47th Anniversary Event, Sho and Yoh would defeat Takagi and Bushi to win the championships for a 3rd time. In June, Roppongi 3K would lose the Junior Tag Team Championships to the team of El Phantasmo and Taiji Ishimori. In November, Sho and Yoh would win the Super Junior Tag League for the 3rd time in a row. At Wrestle Kingdom 14, Roppongi 3K would defeat Phantasmo and Ishimori to win the titles for the 4th time. Roppongi 3K would make their first successful title defense against Desperado and Kanemaru at The New Beginning in Osaka. They would make their second successful title defense against Rocky Romero and Ryusuke Taguchi on the first night of the New Japan Road tour. Following New Japan’s return to producing wrestling shows, Yoh entered the 2020 New Japan Cup losing to Bushi in the first round. During this match, Yoh tore his left ACL which kept him out of action for the rest of 2020.

YOH returned to NJPW during the finals of the 2021 New Japan Cup. Later that year along with partner SHO, YOH entered the Super Junior Tag League. Despite entering as favourites and former winners the pair struggled to pick up any wins.  On August 16, 2021, following a loss to Suzuki-Gun, Sho attacked Yoh, ending their 8-year partnership.

Championships and accomplishments 

 New Japan Pro-Wrestling
 NEVER Openweight 6-Man Tag Team Championship (1 time) - with Hirooki Goto and Yoshi-Hashi
 IWGP Junior Heavyweight Tag Team Championship (5 times) – with Sho
 Super Jr. Tag Tournament/League (2017, 2018, 2019, 2022) – with Sho (3)and Lio Rush
 Pro Wrestling Illustrated
 Ranked No. 177 of the top 500 singles wrestlers in the PWI 500 in 2022
 Ranked No. 10 of the top 50 tag teams in the PWI Tag Team 50 in 2020 
 Wrestling Observer Awards
 Rookie of the Year (2013)

References

External links 

 
 
 

1988 births
21st-century professional wrestlers
Japanese male professional wrestlers
Living people
Sportspeople from Miyagi Prefecture
Chaos (professional wrestling) members
Sasuke (TV series) contestants
IWGP Junior Heavyweight Tag Team Champions
NEVER Openweight 6-Man Tag Team Champions